Maxwell's relations are a set of equations in thermodynamics which are derivable from the symmetry of second derivatives and from the definitions of the thermodynamic potentials. These relations are named for the nineteenth-century physicist James Clerk Maxwell.

Equations

The structure of Maxwell relations is a statement of equality among the second derivatives for continuous functions. It follows directly from the fact that the order of differentiation of an analytic function of two variables is irrelevant (Schwarz theorem).

where the partial derivatives are taken with all other natural variables held constant. For every thermodynamic potential there are  possible Maxwell relations where  is the number of natural variables for that potential.

The four most common Maxwell relations 

The four most common Maxwell relations are the equalities of the second derivatives of each of the four thermodynamic potentials, with respect to their thermal natural variable (temperature , or entropy  and their mechanical natural variable (pressure , or volume 

where the potentials as functions of their natural thermal and mechanical variables are the internal energy , enthalpy , Helmholtz free energy , and Gibbs free energy . The thermodynamic square can be used as a mnemonic to recall and derive these relations. The usefulness of these relations lies in their quantifying entropy changes, which are not directly measurable, in terms of measurable quantities like temperature, volume, and pressure.

Each equation can be re-expressed using the relationship

which are sometimes also known as Maxwell relations.

Derivation 
Maxwell relations are based on simple partial differentiation rules, in particular the total differential of a function and the symmetry of evaluating second order partial derivatives.

Derivation based on Jacobians 

If we view the first law of thermodynamics,

as a statement about differential forms, and take the exterior derivative of this equation, we get

since . This leads to the fundamental identity

The physical meaning of this identity can be seen by noting that the two sides are the equivalent ways of writing the work done in an infinitesimal Carnot cycle. An equivalent way of writing the identity is

The Maxwell relations now follow directly. For example,

The critical step is the penultimate one. The other Maxwell relations follow in similar fashion. For example,

General Maxwell relationships 

The above are not the only Maxwell relationships. When other work terms involving other natural variables besides the volume work are considered or when the number of particles is included as a natural variable, other Maxwell relations become apparent. For example, if we have a single-component gas, then the number of particles N  is also a natural variable of the above four thermodynamic potentials. The Maxwell relationship for the enthalpy with respect to pressure and particle number would then be:

where  is the chemical potential. In addition, there are other thermodynamic potentials besides the four that are commonly used, and each of these potentials will yield a set of Maxwell relations. For example, the grand potential  yields:

See also 
 Table of thermodynamic equations
 Thermodynamic equations

References 

James Clerk Maxwell
Thermodynamic equations